Glock: The Rise of America's Gun is a 320-page book written by Paul M. Barrett and published by Broadway Books.

The book details the history of the famous Glock pistol.  It also points out the business mistakes of rival gunmakers that helped Glock surpass them all.

Development
Barrett got a lot of his information from court documents as well as interviews with former executives of Glock Ges.m.b.H.

Reception
The New York Times calls it "engaging if uneven history of the most famous handgun in contemporary America."
Publishers Weekly states "Barrett is right on target, delivering a well-oiled, fact-packed, and fast-paced history of the Glock."
Daniel Horan of The Wall Street Journal who called it "a fascinating look at one man's extraordinary success".

References

21st-century history books
Firearm books
2012 non-fiction books
Broadway Books books